The Singles Collection is a compilation album by the American alternative rock band Silversun Pickups. It was released on February 25, 2014 through Dangerbird Records in North America. The album was released on regular digital and CD formats and includes one new song, "Cannibal". A limited edition vinyl box-set contained six 7-inch records and an additional extra track "Devil's Cup" originally from the Swoon album sessions.

Track listing

Personnel
Silversun Pickups
Brian Aubert – lead vocals, guitar
Nikki Monninger – bass guitar, backing vocals
Joe Lester – keyboards, samples, sound manipulation
Chris Guanlao – drums, percussion 

Additional musicians
Tanya Haden – cello on track 1
Jacknife Lee – additional keyboards on tracks 8–10

References

2014 compilation albums
Silversun Pickups albums
Dangerbird Records albums